Small nuclear ribonucleoprotein F is a protein that in humans is encoded by the SNRPF gene.

Interactions 

Small nuclear ribonucleoprotein polypeptide F has been shown to interact with DDX20, Small nuclear ribonucleoprotein D2 and Small nuclear ribonucleoprotein polypeptide E.

References

Further reading